Aqda (also Romanized as ‘Aqdā; also known as Aghda) is a city in, and the capital of, Aqda District of Ardakan County, Yazd province, Iran. At the 2006 census, its population was 1,583 in 432 households. The following census in 2011 counted 1,809 people in 566 households. The latest census in 2016 showed a population of 1,754 people in 602 households, all Persians.

The city was founded by one of the military commanders of Yazdegerd I, the Sasanian ruler of Iran from 399 to 420.

References

Sources 
 

Ardakan County

Cities in Yazd Province

Populated places in Yazd Province

Populated places in Ardakan County